The Snow Goose is a 1971 British television drama film based on the 1941 novella The Snow Goose: A Story of Dunkirk by Paul Gallico.

It won a Golden Globe Award for Best Television Film and was nominated for a British Academy Television Award for Best Drama Production. It was also nominated for a nine Primetime Emmy Awards, winning one for Jenny Agutter for Outstanding Performance by an Actress in a Supporting Role in a Drama. The film was shown in the United States on 15 November 1971 as part of the anthology series Hallmark Hall of Fame.

Plot
The film follows the relationship between Fritha (Jenny Agutter), an orphaned young girl, and Philip Rhayader (Richard Harris), a lighthouse keeper in the fishing village Great Marsh in Essex in the United Kingdom. The two meet as Rhayader helps Fritha care for a snow goose she has found, despite his solitary lifestyle. The bird has been injured by hunters shooting at it.

Set at the beginning of World War II, the film uses the backdrop of the ongoing political events and battles throughout the narrative. As the goose heals, Fritha and the goose leave Rhayader. Rhayader once again becomes reclusive and confines himself to his lighthouse lodging.

As Germany invades Poland and the war begins, Rhayader applies to the Observer Corps, but is denied due to his disabilities. Fritha and the goose eventually return to Rhayader, but Rhayader ventures out to help rescue the British Expeditionary Force, trapped on the beaches of Dunkirk. He is killed during the Dunkirk evacuation, and the goose returns to Fritha, who is now grown up. She realises she had come to love Rhayader and is able to save one of the paintings he had made of her, as a child with the wounded goose, before the lighthouse and all other artwork are obliterated by a German pilot.

Cast
 Richard Harris as Philip Rhayader
 Jenny Agutter as Fritha
 Graham Crowden as the recruiting officer
 Julian Somers as Jim 
 Freda Bamford as the postmistress
 Noel Johnson as the naval captain
 Gary Watson as the narrator
 William Marlowe as a soldier

Awards and nominations

References

External links
 

1971 television films
1971 films
Films based on works by Paul Gallico
British television films
Dunkirk evacuation films
Best Miniseries or Television Movie Golden Globe winners
Films scored by Carl Davis